Walter Deville N. "Wallie" Babb (3 December 1940 – 1999) was a hurdler who represented Northern Rhodesia. He competed in the men's 110 metres hurdles at the 1964 Summer Olympics.

References

External links
 

1940 births
1999 deaths
Athletes (track and field) at the 1964 Summer Olympics
Zambian male hurdlers
Olympic athletes of Northern Rhodesia
Northern Rhodesia people